Animal welfare and rights in Hong Kong relates to animal rights, such as the treatment of non-human animals in fields such as agriculture, hunting, medical testing, animal conservation, and the domestic ownership of animals in Hong Kong, and are generally protected under Cap. 169 Prevention of Cruelty to Animals Ordinance, Cap. 169A Prevention of Cruelty to Animals Regulations, Cap. 139 Public Health (Animals and Birds) Ordinance, Cap. 167 Dogs and Cats Ordinance and Cap. 421 Rabies Ordinance.

Legislations

Animal rights activism

See also
 Animal welfare and rights in China
 Animal rights by country or territory
 Chinese Animal Protection Network
 Lychee and Dog Meat Festival, held each June
 Dog meat in China
 Wang Yan (activist), dog rescuer
 List of animal rights advocates
 Speciesism

Notes

 
Animal rights movement
Politics of China
Politics of Hong Kong
Animal welfare and rights legislation